Carbon sulfide may refer to:

 Carbon disulfide
 Carbon monosulfide
 Carbon subsulfide
 Sulflower